Matthew may refer to:

 Matthew (given name)
 Matthew (surname)
 Matthew (ship), the replica of the ship sailed by John Cabot in 1497
 Matthew (album), a 2000 album by rapper Kool Keith
 Matthew (elm cultivar), a cultivar of the Chinese Elm Ulmus parvifolia

Christianity 
 Matthew the Apostle, one of the apostles of Jesus
 Gospel of Matthew, a book of the Bible

See also
 Matt (given name), the diminutive form of Matthew
 Mathew, alternative spelling of Matthew
 Matthews (disambiguation)
 Matthew effect
 Tropical Storm Matthew (disambiguation)